The Turbomeca Arbizon is a small turbojet engine used to power the Otomat anti-shipping missile. Developed from the Turbomeca Turmo the Arbizon was first  made public in 1970 by the French manufacturer Turbomeca, by 1978 the engine had been improved to produce just over 3.5 kN thrust (800 lbf) with a stated service life of 30 hours.

Applications
Miles Student (intended application)
Otomat

Variants
Arbizon IIIB
Initial variant.
Arbizon IV
Smaller and lighter variant producing 3.3 kN (741 lbf).

Specifications (Arbizon IIIB)

See also

References

Notes

Bibliography

 Taylor, John W.R. Jane's All the World's Aircraft 1982-83., London, Jane's Publishing Company Ltd, 1982. . 

Arbizon
1970s turbojet engines
Centrifugal-flow turbojet engines